The Croatian Women's First Handball League is the top women's handball league in Croatia. It is organized by the Croatian Handball Federation. The league comprises fourteen teams.

Current teams 

As of 2021–22 season

 Bjelovar - Bjelovar
 Dalmatinka - Ploče
 Dugo Selo 55 - Dugo Selo 
 Koka - Varaždin
 Lokomotiva - Zagreb 
 Osijek - Osijek
 Podravka Vegeta - Koprivnica 
 Sesvete Agroproteinka - Sesvete, Zagreb 
 Split 2010 - Split 
 Trešnjevka - Zagreb
 Trogir 58 - Trogir 
 Umag - Umag 
 Zelina - Sveti Ivan Zelina 
 Zrinski - Čakovec

EHF league ranking
EHF League Ranking for 2022/23 season:

6.  (4)  Liga Națională (94.50)
7.  (7)  Prva Liga (61.33)
8.  (9)  1. HRL (57.00) 
9.  (8)  Handball Bundesliga Frauen (56.33) 
10.  (11)  1. A DRLList of champions
Key

Performance by club

Teams in bold''' compete in the First League as of the 2021–22 season.

See also
 Croatian Premier Handball League

References

External links 
Croatian Handball Federation

Croatia
Women's handball in Croatia
1991 establishments in Croatia
Sports leagues established in 1991
Women's sports leagues in Croatia
Professional sports leagues in Croatia